This is a list of monitors of the Netherlands navy.

 
  (1868)
  (1868)
 
  (1868)
  (1870)
 
  (1867)
  (1868)
  (1868)
 
  (1869)
  (1869)
 
  (1870)
  (1870)
  (1871)
  (1871) 
  (1871)
  (1876)
  (1877)
  (1878)
  (1891)

See also
List of cruisers of the Netherlands
List of battleships of the Netherlands
List of ships of the Royal Netherlands Navy

References

Bibliography

External links
List of monitors of the Netherlands

Naval ships of the Netherlands